The Coolpix S10 is a model of digital camera formerly produced by Nikon and first released in 2006 as part of the Coolpix Series. Its image sensor is a CCD with 6.0 million pixels. It has a  thin-film transistor liquid crystal display device with 230,000 pixels. The S10 incorporates Nikon's popular swivel design first seen in the Coolpix 900 which allows for a powerful Nikkor 10X Optical zoom lens while retaining a compact form.  Other features include D-Lighting and Face-priority AF.

The 2006 Nikon Coolpix S10 has a similar 10x swivel lens design as the 2005 S4, but with more advanced features such as vibration reduction and a lithium ion battery.

Noted use
The Coolpix S10 was used by photographer Noah Kalina to capture a series of self-portraits in his video Everyday. He began using this camera for the project in 2009.

See also 

 Nikon Coolpix S1
 Nikon Coolpix S3
 Nikon Coolpix S4
 Nikon Coolpix 950

References

General references

External links

 
 Nikon Coolpix S10 at DPReview
 Nikon Coolpix S10 at The Imaging Resource
 Nikon Coolpix S10 on Camera-wiki.org

S0010
Cameras introduced in 2006